Vidhi Pandya  is an Indian actress who works in Hindi television. She made her acting debut in 2014 with Tum Aise Hi Rehna portraying Kiran Mehra. Pandya is best known for her portrayal of Imli Singh Rajvanshi in Udaan, Suman Tiwari Malhotra in Ek Duje Ke Vaaste 2 and Soumya Verma in Mose Chhal Kiye Jaaye.

Career
Pandya made her acting debut in 2014 with Tum Aise Hi Rehna portraying Kiran Maheshwari. She then portrayed Nidhi Anand in Balika Vadhu from 2015 to 2016. In 2015, she played Rohini Singh / Sophia in various episodes of Crime Patrol.

From 2016 to 2019, Pandya portrayed Imli Singh Rajvanshi in Udaan opposite Paras Arora and Vikas Bhalla, which proved as a major turning point in her career.

She then appeared in an episode of Kitchen Champion in 2019. The same year, she played Rani in an episode of Laal Ishq as Rani alongside Saheem Khan and Mehnaz Shroff.

Pandya in 2021 portrayed Major Dr. Suman Tiwari Malhotra in Ek Duje Ke Vaaste 2 opposite Mohit Kumar. In October 2021, she participated in Bigg Boss 15 and got evicted by housemates on Day 18. 

In 2022, she portrayed the role of Soumya Verma in Mose Chhal Kiye Jaaye opposite Vijayendra Kumeria.

Filmography

Television

Awards and nominations

References

External links 

 

1996 births
Living people
Indian television actresses
Actresses in Hindi television
Actresses from Mumbai
Bigg Boss (Hindi TV series) contestants